Transmembrane protein 248, also known as C7orf42, is a gene that in humans encodes the TMEM248 protein. This gene contains multiple transmembrane domains and is composed of seven exons.TMEM248 is predicted to be a component of the plasma membrane and be involved in vesicular trafficking. It has low tissue specificity, meaning it is ubiquitously expressed in tissues throughout the human body. Orthology analyses determined that TMEM248 is highly conserved, having homology with vertebrates and invertebrates. TMEM248 may play a role in cancer development. It was shown to be more highly expressed in cases of colon, breast, lung, ovarian, brain, and renal cancers.

Gene 
TMEM248 is located at chromosome 7 at location 7q11.21 with 37,327 base pairs, spanning from position 66,921,225 to 66,958,551. It has 7 exons and is located on the sense strand.

Transcript 

TMEM248 contains 7 exons, seen in Figure 1. A single gene can have multiple isoforms produced by alternative splicing. TMEM248 has four isoforms summarized in Table 1.

Messenger RNA 

An annotated conceptual translation of TMEM248 is seen in Figure 1. TMEM248 mRNA is most highly expressed in the thyroid, endometrium, prostate, testis, and ovaries, though it is ubiquitously expressed at varying levels in most tissue types.

Protein 

TMEM248 is a multi-pass component of the membrane and functions in protein binding and vesicular transport. TMEM248 has both low tissue and single cell type specificity, but single cell expression cluster is in macrophages. The polypeptide chain of TMEM248 is 314 amino acids long and the molecular weight is approximately 35 kDa. TMEM248 is threonine-rich, meaning that it has a higher-than-average amount of threonine residues. Additionally, it is a more acidic than basic molecule. The basal isoelectric point of TMEM248 is 5.91 pH.

Subcellular localization 
Immunofluorescence staining shows TMEM248 localization to vesicles.The subcellular location of TMEM248 is predicted to be the endoplasmic reticulum membrane, in vesicles, and in the plasma membrane.

Post-translational modifications 
Predicted post-translational modifications for TMEM248 protein include glycosylation, ubiquitylation, and phosphorylation. Ubiquitylation at K228, K240, and K245, glycosylation at N80, and phosphorylation at Y13 and S300 were experimentally determined.

Homology and evolution 
Homologs of the TMEM248 gene are found in vertebrates and invertebrates. The most distant orthologs of TMEM248 are in echinoderms, mollusks, and arthropods, which diverged approximately 680 million years ago. Orthologs of TMEM248 are not found in annelids, nematodes, cnidarians, sponges, fungi, plants, or bacteria.

*DoD = date of divergence; MYA = million years ago.
TMEM248 has two paralogs in humans: TMEM219 and insulin-like growth factor binding protein 3 (IGFBP3) receptor isoform 2 precursor. The TMEM219 protein has 34.9% similarity and 21.1% identity to TMEM248. The IGFBP3 receptor isoform 2 precursor protein has 36.4% similarity and 21.9% identity to TMEM248.

TMEM219 is a death receptor that induces apoptosis (a type of programmed cell death) via a caspase-8 dependent mechanism, and the ligand for this receptor is IGFBP3. The TMEM219/IGFBP3 signaling pathway is experimentally shown to regulate pancreatic beta cell function.

Clinical significance 
TMEM248 has proposed connections to various forms of cancer. Mutations in the gene have been recorded in tumor samples from stomach, colorectal, lung, bladder, ovarian, endometrial, and breast cancer. Of the tumor samples observed, stomach tumors were most likely to contain mutations of TMEM248. There is relatively higher expression of TMEM248 in colon, breast, lung, ovarian, brain, and renal cancer. Multiple myeloma (cancer of unrestricted B cell proliferation in bone marrow) progression and drug sensitivity could regulate TMEM248 expression. These experimentally determined conclusions implicate TMEM248 playing a role in cell proliferation, and make expression of TMEM248 a potential candidate for more intensive studies in the development of cancer in these organs. However, the TMEM248 gene product is not prognostic for cancer with the current available research.

References 

Human genes
Human proteins
Transmembrane proteins